Fireside is an unincorporated community in Seneca County, in the U.S. state of Ohio.

History
A post office called Fireside was established in 1866, and remained in operation until 1900. The advent of Rural Free Delivery caused Fireside's post office to be discontinued.

References

Unincorporated communities in Seneca County, Ohio
Unincorporated communities in Ohio